Bang Khlo is a khwaeng (subdistrict) of Bang Kho Laem district, in Bangkok, Thailand. In 2020, it had a total population of 35,838 people.

References

Subdistricts of Bangkok
Bang Kho Laem district